Mabuterol is a selective β2 adrenoreceptor agonist.

Synthesis

The halogenation of 2-(Trifluoromethyl)aniline [88-17-5] (1) with iodine and sodium bicarbonate resulted in 2-Amino-5-Iodobenzotrifluoride [97760-97-9] (2). Protection with acetic anhydride followed by nucleophilic aromatic displacement with copper(I)cyanide gave N-[4-cyano-2-(trifluoromethyl)phenyl]acetamide [175277-96-0] (3). Hydrolysis of the nitrile and the protecting group gave 4-amino-3-(trifluoromethyl)benzoic acid [400-76-0] (4). Halogenation with chlorine gave 4-Amino-3-Chloro-5-(Trifluoromethyl)Benzoic Acid [95656-52-3] (5). Halogenation of the acid with thionyl chloride gave 4-Amino-3-chloro-5-(trifluoromethyl)benzoylchloride [63498-15-7] (6). Treatment with diethyl malonate [105-53-3] gave the acetophenone and hence 1-[4-amino-3-chloro-5-(trifluoromethyl)phenyl]ethanone [97760-76-4] (7). Halogenation with bromine in acetic acid led to 1-[4-amino-3-chloro-5-(trifluoromethyl)phenyl]-2-bromoethanone [97760-87-7] (8). Treatment with tert-butylamine [75-64-9] yielded 1-[4-amino-3-chloro-5-(trifluoromethyl)phenyl]-2-(tert-butylamino)ethenone, CID:13355601 (9). Reduction of the ketone with sodium borohydride completed the synthesis of Mabuterol (10).

See also 
 Clenbuterol
 Cimaterol
 Trantinterol (regioisomer)

References 

Aromatic amines
Chlorobenzenes
Phenylethanolamines
Tert-butyl compounds
Trifluoromethyl compounds